The ashy-throated bush tanager (Chlorospingus canigularis) is a species of bird traditionally placed in the family Thraupidae, but perhaps closer to Arremonops in the Passerellidae.
It is found in Colombia, Costa Rica, Ecuador, Panama, Peru, and Venezuela.
Its natural habitats are subtropical or tropical dry forests, subtropical or tropical moist lowland forests, and subtropical or tropical moist montane forests.

References

ashy-throated bush-tanager
Birds of Costa Rica
Birds of Panama
Birds of the Colombian Andes
Birds of the Ecuadorian Andes
Birds of the Peruvian Andes
ashy-throated bush tanager
Taxonomy articles created by Polbot